The 2005 Big West Conference men's basketball tournament was held March 9–12 at Anaheim Convention Center in Anaheim, California.

 defeated Pacific in the championship game, 65–52, to obtain the sixth Big West Conference men's basketball tournament championship in school history.

The Aggies earned the conference's automatic bid to the 2005 NCAA Division I men's basketball tournament as the #14 seed in the Chicago regional. Pacific received an at-large bid as the #8 seed in the Albuquerque regional.

Format

Teams were seeded based on regular season conference records. The top four seeds received byes, with the top two seeds receiving a second bye into the semifinal round.

Bracket

References

Big West Conference men's basketball tournament
Tournament
Big West Conference men's basketball tournament
Big West Conference men's basketball tournament